Abraham Schenck was an American politician from New York.

Life
He lived in Fishkill, New York.

He was a member of the New York State Senate from 1796 to 1799.

Sources
The New York Civil List compiled by Franklin Benjamin Hough (pages 116f and 145; Weed, Parsons and Co., 1858)

New York (state) state senators
People from Fishkill, New York
New York (state) Democratic-Republicans
Year of birth missing
Year of death missing